This was the first edition of the tournament since 2008.

Lyudmyla Kichenok and Xenia Knoll won the title, defeating Tara Moore and Nicola Slater in the final, 7–6(8–6), 6–3.

Seeds

Draw

External Links
 Draw

Aegon Surbiton Trophy - Doubles
Aegon Surbiton Trophy